Demetri Corahorgi (January 3, 1880-October 15, 1973) was a fireman first class serving in the United States Navy during who received the Medal of Honor for bravery.

Biography
Corahorgi was born January 3, 1880, in Trieste, Austria (now in Italy) and after immigrating to the United States he joined the navy from New York.

He died October 15, 1973, and is buried in Mount Pleasant Cemetery, Seattle. His grave can be found in section B, lot 2.

Medal of Honor citation
Rank and organization: Fireman First Class, U.S. Navy. Place and date: Aboard U.S.S. Iowa, 25 January 1905. Entered service at: New York. Born: 3 January 1880, Trieste, Austria. G.O. No.: 182, 20 March 1905.

Citation:

Serving on board the U.S.S. Iowa for extraordinary heroism at the time of the blowing out of the manhole plate of boiler D on board that vessel, 25 January 1905.

See also

List of Medal of Honor recipients in non-combat incidents

References

External links

1880 births
1973 deaths
United States Navy Medal of Honor recipients
United States Navy non-commissioned officers
People from Chicago
Austro-Hungarian emigrants to the United States
Foreign-born Medal of Honor recipients
Non-combat recipients of the Medal of Honor